Classified information is material that a government body deems to be sensitive information that must be protected. Access is restricted by law or regulation to particular groups of people with the necessary security clearance and need to know, and mishandling of the material can incur criminal penalties.

A formal security clearance is required to view or handle classified material. The clearance process requires a satisfactory background investigation. Documents and other information must be properly marked "by the author" with one of several (hierarchical) levels of sensitivity—e.g. restricted, confidential, secret, and top secret. The choice of level is based on an impact assessment; governments have their own criteria, including how to determine the classification of an information asset and rules on how to protect information classified at each level. This process often includes security clearances for personnel handling the information.

Some corporations and non-government organizations also assign levels of protection to their private information, either from a desire to protect trade secrets, or because of laws and regulations governing various matters such as personal privacy, sealed legal proceedings and the timing of financial information releases.

With the passage of time much classified information can become less sensitive, and may be declassified and made public. Since the late twentieth century there has been freedom of information legislation in some countries, whereby the public is deemed to have the right to all information that is not considered to be damaging if released. Sometimes documents are released with information still considered confidential obscured (redacted), as in the adjacent example.

The question exists among some political science and legal experts whether the definition of classified ought to be information that would cause injury to the cause of justice, human rights, etc., rather than information that would cause injury to the national interest; to distinguish when classifying information is in the collective best interest of a just society, or merely the best interest of a society acting unjustly to protect its people, government, or administrative officials from legitimate recourses consistent with a fair and just social contract.

Government classification
The purpose of classification is to protect information. Higher classifications protect information that might endanger national security. Classification formalises what constitutes a "state secret" and accords different levels of protection based on the expected damage the information might cause in the wrong hands.

However, classified information is frequently "leaked" to reporters by officials for political purposes. Several U.S. presidents have leaked sensitive information to influence public opinion.

Typical classification levels
Although the classification systems vary from country to country, most have levels corresponding to the following British definitions (from the highest level to lowest).

Top Secret (TS) 

Top Secret is the highest level of classified information. Information is further compartmented so that specific access using a code word after top secret is a legal way to hide collective and important information. Such material would cause "exceptionally grave damage" to national security if made publicly available. Prior to 1942, the United Kingdom and other members of the British Empire used Most Secret, but this was later changed to match the United States' category name of Top Secret in order to simplify Allied interoperability.

The Washington Post reported in an investigation entitled "Top Secret America" that, as of 2010, "An estimated 854,000 people ... hold top-secret security clearances" in the United States.

Secret

Secret material would cause "serious damage" to national security if it were publicly available.

In the United States, operational "Secret" information can be marked with an additional "LimDis", to limit distribution.

Confidential
Confidential material would cause "damage" or be prejudicial to national security if publicly available.

Restricted
Restricted material would cause "undesirable effects" if publicly available. Some countries do not have such a classification in public sectors, such as commercial industries. Such a level is also known as "Private Information".

Official
Official (equivalent to US DOD classification FOUO – For Official Use Only) material forms the generality of government business, public service delivery and commercial activity. This includes a diverse range of information, of varying sensitivities, and with differing consequences resulting from compromise or loss. Official information must be secured against a threat model that is broadly similar to that faced by a large private company.

The Official Sensitive classification replaced the Restricted classification in April 2014 in the UK; Official indicates the previously used Unclassified marking.

Unclassified

Unclassified is technically not a classification level. Though this is a feature of some classification schemes, used for government documents that do not merit a particular classification or which have been declassified. This is because the information is low-impact, and therefore does not require any special protection, such as vetting of personnel.

A plethora of pseudo-classifications exist under this category.

Clearance
Clearance is a general classification, that comprises a variety of rules controlling the level of permission required to view some classified information, and how it must be stored, transmitted, and destroyed. Additionally, access is restricted on a "need to know" basis. Simply possessing a clearance does not automatically authorize the individual to view all material classified at that level or below that level. The individual must present a legitimate "need to know" in addition to the proper level of clearance.

Compartmented information
In addition to the general risk-based classification levels, additional compartmented constraints on access exist, such as (in the U.S.) Special Intelligence (SI), which protects intelligence sources and methods, No Foreign dissemination (NoForn), which restricts dissemination to U.S. nationals, and Originator Controlled dissemination (OrCon), which ensures that the originator can track possessors of the information. Information in these compartments is usually marked with specific keywords in addition to the classification level.

Government information about nuclear weapons often has an additional marking to show it contains such information (CNWDI).

International
When a government agency or group shares information between an agency or group of other country's government they will generally employ a special classification scheme that both parties have previously agreed to honour.

For example, the marking Atomal, is applied to U.S. Restricted Data or Formerly Restricted Data and United Kingdom Atomic information that has been released to NATO. Atomal information is marked COSMIC Top Secret Atomal (CTSA), NATO Secret Atomal (NSAT), or NATO Confidential Atomal (NCA). BALK and BOHEMIA are also used.

NATO classifications

For example, sensitive information shared amongst NATO allies has four levels of security classification; from most to least classified:
 COSMIC Top Secret (CTS) 
 NATO Secret (NS)
 NATO Confidential (NC)
 NATO Restricted (NR)

A special case exists with regard to NATO Unclassified (NU) information. Documents with this marking are NATO property (copyright) and must not be made public without NATO permission.

COSMIC is an acronym for "Control Of Secret Material in an International Command".

International organizations
 The European Union has four levels: EU Top Secret, EU Secret, EU Confidential, EU Restricted. (Note that usually the French terms are used.)
Très Secret UE/EU Top Secret: information and material the unauthorised disclosure of which could cause exceptionally grave prejudice to the essential interests of the European Union or of one or more of the Member States;
Secret UE/EU Secret: information and material the unauthorised disclosure of which could seriously harm the essential interests of the European Union or of one or more of the Member States;
Confidentiel UE/EU Confidential: information and material the unauthorised disclosure of which could harm the essential interests of the European Union or of one or more of the Member States;
Restreint UE/EU Restricted: information and material the unauthorised disclosure of which could be disadvantageous to the interests of the European Union or of one or more of the Member States.
 Organisation for Joint Armament Cooperation, a European defence organisation, has three levels of classification: OCCAR Secret, OCCAR Confidential, and OCCAR Restricted.
 ECIPS, the European Centre for Information Policy and Security, has four levels of Security Information, COSMIC (Top Secret), EC-Secret, EC-Confidential and EC-Committees.
 The United Nations has two classification levels: Confidential and Strictly Confidential.

By country

Most countries employ some sort of classification system for certain government information. For example, in Canada, information that the U.S. would classify SBU (Sensitive but Unclassified) is called "protected" and further subcategorised into levels A, B, and C.

Australia
On 19 July 2011, the National Security (NS) classification marking scheme and the Non-National Security (NNS) classification marking scheme in Australia was unified into one structure.

As of 2018, the policy detailing how Australian government entities handle classified information is defined in the Protective Security Policy Framework (PSPF). The PSPF is published by the Attorney-General's Department and covers security governance, information security, personal security, and physical security.  A security classification can be applied to the information itself or an asset that holds information e.g., a USB or laptop.

The PSPF outlines three categories of sensitive information, Unofficial, Official and Official: Sensitive. Additionally, the PSPF defines three levels of security classified information, Protected, Secret and Top Secret.

A caveats is a warning that the information has special protections in addition to those indicated by the security classification. Australia has four categories of caveats:

 Codewords (sensitive compartmented information)
 Foreign government markings
 Special handling instructions
 Releasability caveats

Special handling instructions are used to indicate particular precautions for information handling. They include Exclusive For, Cabinet and National Cabinet. A releasability caveat restricts information based on citizenship. The three in use are: Australian Eyes Only (AUSTEO), Australian Government Access Only (AGAO) and Releasable To (REL).

Additionally, the PSPF outlines Information Management Markers (IMM) as a way for entities to identify information that is subject to non-security related restrictions on access and use. These are: legal privilege, legislative secret, and personal privacy.

Brazil

A top secret government-issued document may be classified for a period of 25 years, which may be extended up to another 25 years. Thus, no document remains classified for more than 50 years. This is mandated by the 2011 Information Access Law, a change from the previous rule, under which documents could have their classification time length renewed indefinitely, effectively shuttering state secrets from the public. The 2011 law applies retroactively to existing documents.

Canada

Background and hierarchy
The government of Canada employs two main types of sensitive information designation: Classified and Protected. The access and protection of both types of information is governed by the Security of Information Act, effective 24 December 2001, replacing the Official Secrets Act 1981. To access the information, a person must have the appropriate security clearance and the need to know.

In addition, the caveat "Canadian Eyes Only" is used to restrict access to Classified or Protected information only to Canadian citizens with the appropriate security clearance and need to know.

Special operational information
SOI is not a classification of data per se. It is defined under the Security of Information Act, and unauthorised release of such information constitutes a higher breach of trust, with a penalty of up to life imprisonment if the information is shared with a foreign entity or terrorist group.

SOIs include:
 military operations in respect of a potential, imminent or present armed conflict
 the identity of confidential source of information, intelligence or assistance to the Government of Canada
 tools used for information gathering or intelligence
 the object of a covert investigation, or a covert collection of information or intelligence
 the identity of any person who is under covert surveillance
 encryption and cryptographic systems
 information or intelligence to, or received from, a foreign entity or terrorist group

Classified information
Classified information can be designated Top Secret, Secret or Confidential. These classifications are only used on matters of national interest.
 Top Secret: applies when compromise might reasonably cause exceptionally grave injury to the national interest. The possible impact must be great, immediate and irreparable.
 Secret: applies when compromise might reasonably cause serious injury to the national interest.
 Confidential: disclosure might reasonably cause injury to the national interest.

Protected information
Protected information is not classified. It pertains to any sensitive information that does not relate to national security and cannot be disclosed under the access and privacy legislation because of the potential injury to particular public or private interests.
 Protected C (Extremely Sensitive protected information): designates extremely sensitive information, which if compromised, could reasonably be expected to cause extremely grave injury outside the national interest. Examples include bankruptcy, identities of informants in criminal investigations, etc.
 Protected B (Particularly Sensitive protected information): designates information that could cause severe injury or damage to the people or group involved if it was released. Examples include medical records, annual personnel performance reviews, income tax returns, etc.
 Protected A (Low-Sensitive protected information): designates low sensitivity information that should not be disclosed to the public without authorization and could reasonably be expected to cause injury or embarrassment outside the national interest. Example of Protected A information include employee identification number, pay deposit banking information, etc.

Federal Cabinet (Queen's Privy Council for Canada) papers are either protected (e.g., overhead slides prepared to make presentations to Cabinet) or classified (e.g., draft legislation, certain memos).

People's Republic of China

The Criminal Law of the People's Republic of China (which is not operative in the special administrative regions of Hong Kong and Macau) makes it a crime to release a state secret. Regulation and enforcement is carried out by the National Administration for the Protection of State Secrets.

Under the 1989 "Law on Guarding State Secrets", state secrets are defined as those that concern:

 Major policy decisions on state affairs
 The building of national defence and in the activities of the armed forces
 Diplomatic activities and in activities related to foreign countries and those to be maintained as commitments to foreign countries
 National economic and social development
 Science and technology
 Activities for preserving state security and the investigation of criminal offences
 Any other matters classified as "state secrets" by the national State Secrets Bureau

Secrets can be classified into three categories:
 Top Secret, defined as "vital state secrets whose disclosure would cause extremely serious harm to state security and national interests"
 Highly Secret, defined as "important state secrets whose disclosure would cause serious harm to state security and national interests"
 Secret, defined as "ordinary state secrets whose disclosure would cause harm to state security and national interests"

France
In France, classified information is defined by article 413-9 of the Penal Code. The three levels of military classification are
  (Very Secret Defence): Information deemed extremely harmful to national defence, and relative to governmental priorities in national defence. No service or organisation can elaborate, process, stock, transfer, display or destroy information or protected supports classified at this level without authorization from the Prime Minister or the national secretary for National Defence. Partial or exhaustive reproduction is strictly forbidden.
  (Secret Defence): Information deemed very harmful to national defence. Such information cannot be reproduced without authorisation from the emitting authority, except in exceptional emergencies.
  (Confidential Defence): Information deemed potentially harmful to national defence, or that could lead to uncovering some information classified at a higher level of security.

Less sensitive information is "protected". The levels are
  ("Confidential officers")
  ("Confidential non-commissioned officers")
  ("restricted information")
  ("administrative restricted information")
  (unprotected)

A further caveat,  (reserved France) restricts the document to French citizens (in its entirety or by extracts). This is not a classification level.

Transfer of classified information is done with double envelopes, the outer layer being plastified and numbered, and the inner in strong paper. Reception of the document involves examination of the physical integrity of the container and registration of the document. In foreign countries, the document must be transferred through specialised military mail or diplomatic bag. Transport is done by an authorised conveyor or habilitated person for mail under 20 kg. The letter must bear a seal mentioning "". Once a year, ministers have an inventory of classified information and supports by competent authorities.

Once their usage period is expired, documents are transferred to archives, where they are either destroyed (by incineration, crushing, or overvoltage), or stored.

In case of unauthorized release of classified information, competent authorities are the Ministry of Interior, the ' ("high civil servant for defence and security") of the relevant ministry, and the General secretary for National Defence. Violation of such secrets is an offence punishable with seven years of imprisonment and a 100,000 euro fine; if the offence is committed by imprudence or negligence, the penalties are three years of imprisonment and a 45,000 euro fine.

Hong Kong
The Security Bureau is responsible for developing policies in regards to the protection and handling of confidential government information. In general, the system used in Hong Kong is very similar to the UK system, developed from the Colonial Hong Kong era.

Four classifications exists in Hong Kong, from highest to lowest in sensitivity:
 Top Secret
 Secret
 Confidential
 Temporary Confidential
 Restricted
 Restricted (staff)
 Restricted (tender)
 Restricted (administration)

Restricted documents are not classified per se, but only those who have a need to know will have access to such information, in accordance with the Personal Data (Privacy) Ordinance.

New Zealand
New Zealand uses the Restricted classification, which is lower than Confidential. People may be given access to Restricted information on the strength of an authorisation by their Head of department, without being subjected to the background vetting associated with Confidential, Secret and Top Secret clearances. New Zealand's security classifications and the national-harm requirements associated with their use are roughly similar to those of the United States.

In addition to national security classifications there are two additional security classifications, In Confidence and Sensitive, which are used to protect information of a policy and privacy nature. There are also a number of information markings used within ministries and departments of the government, to indicate, for example, that information should not be released outside the originating ministry.

Because of strict privacy requirements around personal information, personnel files are controlled in all parts of the public and private sectors. Information relating to the security vetting of an individual is usually classified at the In Confidence level.

Romania
In Romania, classified information is referred to as "state secrets" and is defined by the Penal Code as "documents and data that manifestly appear to have this status or have been declared or qualified as such by decision of Government". There are three levels of classification—Secret, Top Secret, and Top Secret of Particular Importance. The levels are set by the Romanian Intelligence Service and must be aligned with NATO regulations—in case of conflicting regulations, the latter are applied with priority. Dissemination of classified information to foreign agents or powers is punishable by up to life imprisonment, if such dissemination threatens Romania's national security.

Russia

In the Russian Federation, a state secret (Государственная тайна) is information protected by the state on its military, foreign policy, economic, intelligence, counterintelligence, operational and investigative and other activities, dissemination of which could harm state security.

Sweden

The Swedish classification has been updated due to increased NATO/PfP cooperation. All classified defence documents will now have both a Swedish classification (or ), and an English classification (Top Secret, Secret, Confidential, or Restricted). The term , "protected identity", is used in the case of protection of a threatened person, basically implying "secret identity", accessible only to certain members of the police force and explicitly authorised officials.

Switzerland
At the federal level, classified information in Switzerland is assigned one of three levels, which are from lowest to highest:  Internal, Confidential, Secret. Respectively, these are, in German, ; in French, ; in Italian, . As in other countries, the choice of classification depends on the potential impact that the unauthorised release of the classified document would have on Switzerland, the federal authorities or the authorities of a foreign government.

According to the Ordinance on the Protection of Federal Information, information is classified as Internal if its "disclosure to unauthorised persons may be disadvantageous to national interests."  Information classified as Confidential could, if disclosed, compromise "the free formation of opinions and decision-making of the Federal Assembly or the Federal Council," jeopardise national monetary/economic policy, put the population at risk or adversely affect the operations of the Swiss Armed Forces. Finally, the unauthorised release of Secret information could seriously compromise the ability of either the Federal Assembly or the Federal Council to function or impede the ability of the Federal Government or the Armed Forces to act.

Turkey 

United Kingdom

Until 2013, the United Kingdom used five levels of classification—from lowest to highest, they were: Protect, Restricted, Confidential, Secret and Top Secret (formerly Most Secret). The Cabinet Office provides guidance on how to protect information, including the security clearances required for personnel. Staff may be required to sign to confirm their understanding and acceptance of the Official Secrets Acts 1911 to 1989, although the Act applies regardless of signature. Protect is not in itself a security protective marking level (such as Restricted or greater), but is used to indicate information which should not be disclosed because, for instance, the document contains tax, national insurance, or other personal information.

Government documents without a classification may be marked as Unclassified or Not Protectively Marked.

This system was replaced by the Government Security Classifications Policy, which has a simpler model: Top Secret, Secret, and Official from April 2014. Official Sensitive is a security marking which may be followed by one of three authorised descriptors: Commercial, LocSen (location sensitive) or Personal. Secret and Top Secret may include a caveat such as UK Eyes Only.

Also useful is that scientific discoveries may be classified via the D-Notice system if they are deemed to have applications relevant to national security. These may later emerge when technology improves so for example the specialised processors and routing engines used in graphics cards are loosely based on top secret military chips designed for code breaking and image processing.
They may or may not have safeguards built in to generate errors when specific tasks are attempted and this is invariably independent of the card's operating system.

United States

The U.S. classification system is currently established under Executive Order 13526 and has three levels of classification—Confidential, Secret, and Top Secret. The U.S. had a Restricted level during World War II but no longer does. U.S. regulations state that information received from other countries at the Restricted level should be handled as Confidential. A variety of markings are used for material that is not classified, but whose distribution is limited administratively or by other laws, e.g., For Official Use Only (FOUO), or Sensitive but Unclassified (SBU). The Atomic Energy Act of 1954 provides for the protection of information related to the design of nuclear weapons. The term "Restricted Data" is used to denote certain nuclear technology. Information about the storage, use or handling of nuclear material or weapons is marked "Formerly Restricted Data". These designations are used in addition to level markings (Confidential, Secret and Top Secret). Information protected by the Atomic Energy Act is protected by law and information classified under the Executive Order is protected by Executive privilege.

The U.S. government insists it is "not appropriate" for a court to question whether any document is legally classified. In the 1973 trial of Daniel Ellsberg for releasing the Pentagon Papers, the judge did not allow any testimony from Ellsberg, claiming it was "irrelevant", because the assigned classification could not be challenged. The charges against Ellsberg were ultimately dismissed after it was revealed that the government had broken the law in secretly breaking into the office of Ellsberg's psychiatrist and in tapping his telephone without a warrant. Ellsberg insists that the legal situation in the U.S. in 2014 is worse than it was in 1973, and Edward Snowden could not get a fair trial. The State Secrets Protection Act of 2008 might have given judges the authority to review such questions in camera, but the bill was not passed.

When a government agency acquires classified information through covert means, or designates a program as classified, the agency asserts "ownership" of that information and considers any public availability of it to be a violation of their ownership — even if the same information was acquired independently through "parallel reporting" by the press or others. For example, although the CIA drone program has been widely discussed in public since the early 2000s, and reporters personally observed and reported on drone missile strikes, the CIA still considers the very existence of the program to be classified in its entirety, and any public discussion of it technically constitutes exposure of classified information. "Parallel reporting" was an issue in determining what constitutes "classified" information during the Hillary Clinton email controversy when Assistant Secretary of State for Legislative Affairs Julia Frifield noted, "When policy officials obtain information from open sources, 'think tanks,' experts, foreign government officials, or others, the fact that some of the information may also have been available through intelligence channels does not mean that the information is necessarily classified."

Table of equivalent classification markings in various countries

Corporate classification
Private corporations often require written confidentiality agreements and conduct background checks on candidates for sensitive positions. In the U.S., the Employee Polygraph Protection Act prohibits private employers from requiring lie detector tests, but there are a few exceptions. Policies dictating methods for marking and safeguarding company-sensitive information (e.g. "IBM Confidential") are common and some companies have more than one level. Such information is protected under trade secret laws. New product development teams are often sequestered and forbidden to share information about their efforts with un-cleared fellow employees, the original Apple Macintosh project being a famous example. Other activities, such as mergers and financial report preparation generally involve similar restrictions. However, corporate security generally lacks the elaborate hierarchical clearance and sensitivity structures and the harsh criminal sanctions that give government classification systems their particular tone.

Traffic Light Protocol
The Traffic Light Protocol was developed by the Group of Eight countries to enable the sharing of sensitive information between government agencies and corporations. This protocol has now been accepted as a model for trusted information exchange by over 30 other countries. The protocol provides for four "information sharing levels" for the handling of sensitive information.

See also

 Economic Espionage Act of 1996 (U.S.)
 Espionage
 Espionage Act of 1917 (U.S.)
 Eyes only
 Five Eyes
 Golden Shield Project
 Government Security Classifications Policy (UK)
 Illegal number
 Information security
 Official Secrets Act (UK, India, Ireland, Malaysia, New Zealand)
 Security of Information Act (Canada)
 State Secrets Privilege (US)
 Wassenaar Arrangement
 WikiLeaks
 UKUSA Agreement

References

External links

 Defence Vetting Agency. Carries out national security checks in the UK.
Peter Galison, Removing Knowledge in Critical Inquiry n°31 (Autumn 2004).
 Goldman, Jan, & Susan Maret. Intelligence and information policy for national security: Key terms and concepts. Rowman & Littlefield, 2016.
 Lerner, Brenda Wilmoth, & K. Lee Lerner, eds. Terrorism: Essential primary sources. Thomson Gale, 2006.
 Los Alamos table of equivalent US and UK classifications
 Maret, Susan. On their own terms: A lexicon with an emphasis on information-related terms produced by the U.S. federal government. , FAS, 6th ed., 2016. 
 Marking Classified National Security Information ISOO booklet.
 The National Security Archive – a collection of declassified documents acquired through the FOIA.
 Parliament of Montenegro, Law on confidentiality of data. .
 Parliament of Serbia, Law on confidentiality of data. .
 U.S. Department of Defense National Industrial Security Program - Operating Manual (DoD 5220.22-M), explaining rules and policies for handling classified information.

 
Information sensitivity